Great Bolton was a township of the civil and ecclesiastical parish of Bolton le Moors in the Salford hundred of Lancashire, England. Despite its name, Great Bolton had a smaller acreage than its northern neighbour Little Bolton from which it was separated by the River Croal.

Governance
Historically, Great Bolton formed part of the Hundred of Salford, a judicial division of southeast Lancashire. It was one of the townships that made up the ancient ecclesiastical parish of Bolton le Moors.

Under provisions of the Poor Relief Act 1662, townships replaced civil parishes as the main units of local administration in Lancashire. Great Bolton became one of the eighteen autonomous townships of the civil parish of Bolton le Moors. The township appointed overseers of the poor who levied a rate to fund the Poor Law. Highway surveyors were also appointed and funded from the rate to maintain the roads.

By the eighteenth century Great Bolton was expanding rapidly and the Bolton Improvement Act of 1792 established the Great Bolton Improvement Trustees (or police commissioners) who took responsibility for regulating the streets, securing a water supply, removing nuisances, and licensing conveyances The act also provided the enclosure of Bolton Moor which was divided into building lots. In 1837, Great Bolton became part of the Bolton Poor Law Union, which took over the responsibility for the administration and funding of the Poor Law in that area.

Under the Municipal Corporations Act 1835, the Municipal borough of Bolton was established as a local authority in 1838, which comprised Great Bolton, most of the township of Little Bolton, and the Haulgh area of the township of Tonge with Haulgh. In 1866, Great Bolton changed its status to become a civil parish. Although Great Bolton was part of the Municipal Borough of Bolton from 1838, the township, later civil parish, was used for the censuses until it was abolished in 1895. For recording births, marriages and deaths, Great Bolton continued as a sub-district until 1902, then part of the Great Bolton and Lever sub-district until 1941, both parts of the Bolton Registration district.

Geography
The township was bounded on the north and east by the River Croal which eventually joins the River Irwell. The land was level apart from a clough or steep-banked valley occupied by the river Croal. The south western part of the township was occupied by moorland that gave the parish its early name.

From here the road to the east Churchgate led to the church, Deansgate to the west led towards Deane and Chorley, to the south Bradshawgate led to Manchester and to the north, Bank Street led to Little Bolton.

Demography

See also
Bolton
County Borough of Bolton
Metropolitan Borough of Bolton

References

Local government in the Metropolitan Borough of Bolton
History of Bolton
Former civil parishes in Greater Manchester